Al Rasheed Satellite Channel is an Iraq-based satellite television channel broadcasting from Baghdad where its headquarters is located. Al Rasheed programming includes: news programs, drama and comedy shows. The channel is Owned by Saad Asem Al Janabi and his son Asem Saad Al Janabi.

Availability 
The channel is available for its Arab audience throughout the world via satellite. Online streaming is available through its website.

References

External links 
 Official Website

Television stations in Iraq